Langtry may refer to:

Langtry (surname)
 Langtry, Texas, a town
 Langtry, a crater on Venus

See also 
Langtree (disambiguation)